Lieutenant General Willie Wolmarans is a retired South African Army officer.

He served as Chief Director Manpower Maintenance.
He served as Chief of Staff Personnel from 1992 till his retirement in 1993.

References

South African generals
Living people
Year of birth missing (living people)